The discography of Japanese musician Angela Aki consists of seven studio albums, two compilation albums, one extended play, thirteen singles and five video albums. Her debut album, These Words, was released independently in the United States in early 2000, and was sung entirely in English. After returning to Japan in 2003, Aki followed this with a Japanese-language extended play One, released under Virgo Music in 2005.

Game musician Nobuo Uematsu offered Aki the chance to sing the theme song for the game Final Fantasy XII, after hearing one of her demos in 2003. Aki made her major debut under the Sony Music Japan sub-label Epic Records Japan in 2005 with the single "Home", and released the Final Fantasy XII theme song "Kiss Me Good-Bye" in 2006. Her debut album Home (2006) was certified double platinum by the Recording Industry Association of Japan.

Her most commercially successful singles were released between 2006 and 2008: "This Love" (2006), which was used as an ending theme song for the anime Blood+, "Sakurairo" (2007) and "Tegami (Haikei Jūgo no Kimi e)" (2008), which was the compulsory song learnt by junior high choirs for the 2008 Nationwide Contest of Music sponsored by NHK. "Sakurairo" has been certified gold twice by the Recording Industry Association of Japan, while "This Love" and "Tegami (Haikei Jūgo no Kimi e)" have been certified multi-platinum. Aki's second and third albums, Today (2007) and Answer (2009) both debuted at number one on the Oricon albums chart. For the fifth anniversary since her major-label debut single "Home", Aki released White (2011), an album composed of a mix of new songs, re-recordings and covers. In 2012, Aki released Songbook, a collection of Western music covers from her discography that she had performed on her NHK Educational TV television show Angela Aki no Songbook in English.

After releasing her first greatest hits album Tapestry of Songs: The Best of Angela Aki in 2014, Aki took an indefinite hiatus from music in Japan, moving to the United States in order to enrol in a music school to learn how to write musicals.

Studio albums

Compilation albums

Extended play

Singles

Promotional singles

Video albums

Other appearances

Notes

References

Discographies of Japanese artists
Pop music discographies